Paulo Henrique Rolim de Genova (born 26 August 1997), known as Paulinho, is a Brazilian professional footballer who plays as a midfielder.

Club career
Born in Assis, Paulinho started his career in São Paulo. He made his professional debut on 17 January 2018 against São Bento, for Campeonato Paulista.

On 3 August 2019, he moved to Italy and joined Serie C club Triestina.

On 21 January 2022, he moved on loan to Legnago.

Personal life
He has Italian passport.

References

External links
 
 

1997 births
Living people
Footballers from São Paulo (state)
Brazilian footballers
Brazilian people of Italian descent
Association football midfielders
São Paulo FC players
Serie C players
U.S. Triestina Calcio 1918 players
F.C. Legnago Salus players
People from Assis